Rodney Shane Sieg (August 23, 1982 – August 19, 2017) was an American professional stock car racing driver. He last drove the No. 93 S&W Services Chevrolet for RSS Racing. He was the older brother of Xfinity Series drivers Ryan Sieg and Kyle Sieg.

Racing career

Camping World Truck Series
In 2003, Sieg made his NASCAR debut at New Hampshire International Speedway, driving the No. 08 Chevrolet for SS-Green Light Racing and finishing 16th. For 2004, he was tabbed by SS-Green Light to drive their No. 07 Auto Air Colors Chevy for the entire season. Sieg earned the best result of his career at The Milwaukee Mile when he finished 8th after starting 33rd. This was his only top-10 of the season, however, and he was taken out of the truck after 19 races. He did not attempt any NASCAR races in 2005 or 2006.

In 2007, Sieg made his return to the Truck Series at Bristol Motor Speedway in a one race deal that reunited him with SS-Green Light. He would also run 3 races for Billy Ballew Motorsports with a best finish of 10th at New Hampshire, the track at which he debuted. Sieg started 2008 by running two of the first three races of the season for SS-Green Light, blowing engines in both starts. He was then tabbed by Ballew to race the No. 51 Miccosukee Resorts Toyota on weekends when the Sprint Cup Series and regular driver, Kyle Busch, were running at other tracks. In seven races, he earned one top-10, a 9th-place finish at Memphis Motorsports Park. At the beginning of 2009, Sieg intended to run the entire season in Ballew's No. 15 entry. However, due to a lack of solid sponsorship, he left the team after only five races. He returned later in the year in a second entry for his family's team. He start and parked in seven races to help his brother Ryan run entire races.

In 2010, Sieg and his brother planned to run the full Camping World Truck Series schedule in the No. 93 and No. 39 trucks, respectively. However, Sieg once again ran as a start and park entry in order to help fund his brother's car which planned to run full races, but had no sponsor. Six races into 2010, he was replaced in the No. 93 by long-time ASA driver Mike Garvey. Sieg returned to the team at Texas in November, parking in the final three races of the season. The next year, Sieg gave up his ride at Daytona to rookie Cole Whitt after the No. 60 failed to qualify. Sieg ran a few full races with a best finish of 12th, though he was pulled again at Michigan and replaced by Casey Roderick. NASCAR announced on August 22 that Sieg had been suspended indefinitely from NASCAR for violating their substance abuse policy.

Busch Series
Early in 2004, Sieg attempted three races in the No. 51 Dodge for Rick Ware Racing. After failing to qualify at Rockingham, he qualified for the next two races at Las Vegas and Darlington. He crashed early in both races, finishing 42nd and 37th, respectively.

Death
Sieg died on August 19, 2017, at the age of 34, four days before his 35th birthday.

Motorsports career results

NASCAR
(key) (Bold – Pole position awarded by qualifying time. Italics – Pole position earned by points standings or practice time. * – Most laps led.)

Busch Series

Camping World Truck Series

References

External links
 

1982 births
2017 deaths
American Speed Association drivers
American sportspeople in doping cases
Doping cases in auto racing
NASCAR drivers
CARS Tour drivers
People from Tucker, Georgia
Racing drivers from Atlanta
Racing drivers from Georgia (U.S. state)
Sportspeople from DeKalb County, Georgia